The Reconquest of Constantinople (1261) was the recapture of the city of Constantinople by the forces of the Empire of Nicaea, leading to the re-establishment of the Byzantine Empire under the Palaiologos dynasty, after an interval of 57 years where the city had been the capital of the Latin Empire installed by the Fourth Crusade in 1204.

Background
Following his victory at the Battle of Pelagonia in 1259, the Nicaean emperor, Michael VIII Palaiologos, was left free to pursue the reconquest of Constantinople and the revival of the Byzantine Empire: the rump Latin Empire was now cut off from any aid, from either the Latin states of Greece or from the Nicaeans' Greek rival, the Despotate of Epirus. Already in 1260, Michael Palaiologos attacked Constantinople, as one of the Latin knights taken prisoner in Pelagonia, and whose house was in the city walls, had promised to open a gate for the emperor's troops. He failed to do so, and Palaiologos launched an unsuccessful assault on Galata instead. To further his plans, Michael concluded an alliance with Genoa in March 1261, and in July 1261, as the one-year truce concluded after the failed Nicaean attack was nearing its end, the general Alexios Strategopoulos was sent with a small advance force of 800 soldiers (most of them Cumans) to keep a watch on the Bulgarians and spy out the defences of the Latins.

Capture of Constantinople
Strategopoulos initially hesitated to take advantage of the situation, since his small force might be destroyed if the Latin army returned too soon, and because he would exceed the emperor's orders, but eventually decided he could not squander such a golden opportunity to retake the city.

On the night of 24/25 July 1261, Strategopoulos and his men approached the city walls and hid at a monastery near the Gate of the Spring. Strategopoulos sent a detachment of his men, led by some of the thelematarioi, to make their way to the city through a secret passage. They attacked the walls from the inside, surprised the guards and opened the gate, giving the Nicaean force entry into the city. The Latins were taken completely unaware, and after a short struggle, the Nicaeans gained control of the land walls. As news of this spread across the city, the Latin inhabitants, from Emperor Baldwin II downwards, hurriedly rushed to the harbours of the Golden Horn, hoping to escape by ship. At the same time, Strategopoulos' men set fire to the Venetian buildings and warehouses along the coast to prevent them from landing there. Thanks to the timely arrival of the returning Venetian fleet, many of the Latins managed to evacuate to the still Latin-held parts of Greece, but the city was lost for good.

Aftermath
The recapture of Constantinople signalled the restoration of the Byzantine Empire, and on 15 August, the day of the Dormition of the Theotokos, Emperor Michael VIII entered the city in triumph and was crowned at the Hagia Sophia. The rights of the legitimate emperor, John IV Laskaris, for whom Palaiologos had been ostensibly ruling as a guardian, were brushed aside, and the boy was blinded and imprisoned.

References

Sources 
 
 
 
 

Conflicts in 1261
1260s conflicts
Constantinople 1261
Constantinople 1261